Magner is a surname. Notable people with the surname include:

Colm Magner, Canadian actor, writer, and director
Francis Joseph Magner (1887–1947), American Roman Catholic bishop
John Magner, baseball player
Michael Magner (1840–1897), Irish soldier, recipient of the Victoria Cross
Stubby Magner, baseball player
Ted Magner (1891–1948), English football manager
Thomas F. Magner, U.S. Representative from New York state
Aron Magner, American musician with Disco Biscuits
William Magner, Irish cider manufacturer, connected with Magners